Vikram I Shah is an Indian orthopaedic surgeon, based in Ahmedabad. Shah established Shalby Hospitals in 1994 which is an Indian organisation established in Ahmedabad as a joint replacement centre . Shalby runs a chain of hospitals in Ahmedabad, Surat, Indore, Vapi, Jabalpur, Jaipur and Mohali.

Career 
After completion of his MBBS and MS Orthopaedics in Ahmedabad, Shah worked and trained at Ormskirk Hospital and Wrightington Hospital, UK, for two and a half years, and later worked in the USA. On his return to India, he began surgical practice by establishing Shalby Hospital and Research Centre in Ahmedabad in 1994.

Shah developed the ‘OS Needle’ (Orthopaedic Surgeons’ Needle) which can pass through both bone and soft tissue easily so that an orthopaedic surgeon can finish repairing bone and soft tissues quickly.  It is claimed that this invention has greatly reduced the surgical time in Orthopaedic surgeries.

Achievements 
By the year 2000, out of 17–20,000 surgeries carried out in India every year, 16-17% were conducted by Shah. He achieved a world record by performing 3,000 knee surgeries in a single centre in the year 2008.  In 2012 Shah developed the "zero" technique for TKR, which he claims further reduces the operating time to 7–10 minutes.

Private life 
Vikram Shah is married to Darshini Shah who is a dentist specializing in cosmetic dentistry and dental implants.

References 

Living people
Indian orthopedic surgeons
1962 births